The Kenneth C. Coleman Generating Station is a coal-fired power plant owned and operated by Big Rivers Electric Corporation near Hawesville, Kentucky.

Plant Data
Owner: Big Rivers Electric Corporation
Plant Nameplate Capacity: 521 MW (Megawatts)
Units and In-Service Dates: 174 MW (1969), 174 MW (1970), 173 MW (1971)
Location: 4982 River Rd., Hawesville, KY 42348
GPS Coordinates: 37.9625, -86.791667
Coal Consumption:
Coal Source:
Number of Employees:

Emissions Data
2006 CO2 Emissions: 3,404,057 tons
2006 SO2 Emissions: 10,899 tons
2006 SO2 Emissions per MWh:
2006 NOx Emissions: 5,320 tons
2005 Mercury Emissions: 110 lb.

See also

Coal mining in Kentucky

References

External links
Big Rivers website
Existing Electric Generating Units in the United States, 2005, Energy Information Administration, accessed January 2009.
Environmental Integrity Project, "Dirty Kilowatts: America's Most Polluting Power Plants", July 2007.
Facility Registry System, U.S. Environmental Protection Agency, accessed January 2009.
Carbon Monitoring for Action database, accessed February 2009.

Energy infrastructure completed in 1963
Energy infrastructure completed in 1969
Coal-fired power plants in Kentucky
Buildings and structures in Hancock County, Kentucky
1963 establishments in Kentucky
1969 establishments in Kentucky
2020 disestablishments in Kentucky